Dylan Jacob is the founder of Indiana-based BrüMate, a.k.a The Dehydration Company, that creates and sells insulated beverage containers for the adult beverage industry. He is an American entrepreneur and product designer having been featured on 2018 Forbes 30 under 30 list.

Early life and education 
Jacob was born in Indiana on August 28, 1994. He graduated from Whiteland Community High School in 2013 and dropped out of Purdue University in his second semester.

Career 
Denver-based Jacob started his first company, GV Supply Co, which was an electronics parts distributor in high-school. In May 2014, he sold that company to one of his franchise customers. He then started his second company, Vicci Design, which was a glass tile company that provided unique glass tile for residential and commercial remodels. He provided glass tiles to contractors and homeowners via WayFair, Overstock.com, Houzz and his dealer network. In July 2017, he sold that company, which is still functioning for the new owners.

BrüMate is Jacob’s third company that launched its products in November 2016. He designs and manufactures insulated drinkware for the adult beverage industry and records 1.1M per month in sales as of July 2018. Jacob has designed Hopsulator, Winesulator and Uncork’d XL products for the company. He was instrumental in securing deals with Cabela’s and Olympia Sports.

Awards 
Jacob was featured on the 2018 Forbes 30 under 30 Young Entrepreneurs list and 2018 Forbes 30 under 30 for Retail and E-commerce. He won the EY Entrepreneur of the Year 2019 – Midwest under the Consumer Products & Retail category.

References 

1994 births
Living people
Businesspeople from Indiana
American company founders
Purdue University alumni